The Guangzhou–Kunming passageway is a high-speed railway passage connecting Guangzhou in Guangdong Province and Kunming in Yunnan Province, passing through Nanning en route. Announced in 2016 as part of the national "eight vertical and eight horizontal" high-speed railway network, the line is made up of the existing Nanning–Guangzhou high-speed railway and Nanning–Kunming high-speed railway lines. It is about 986 km in length, and is fully operational as of 28 December 2016.

Sections

References

See also 
 High-speed rail in China

High-speed rail in China